Ifta is a former municipality in the Wartburgkreis district of Thuringia, Germany. Since 1 January 2019, it has been part of the town Treffurt.

References

Wartburgkreis
Former municipalities in Thuringia